is a Japanese manga series written and illustrated by Mikage Chihaya. It was serialized in Houbunsha's Manga Time Kirara Forward between the July 2007 and February 2008 issues; a single tankōbon volume was published in February 2008. An anime series produced by Ufotable has been announced. Auditions for the lead roles were held during the Machi*Asobi anime event in Tokushima Prefecture, starting October 9, 2010.

Plot
The story revolves around Tamaki Kakegawa, a fifth grade girl whose father is a penguin researcher. As such, Tamaki is constantly surrounded by penguins and has grown to hate them. In order to cure Tamaki's hatred of penguins, a "penguinoid" named Minori is built to befriend her.

References

External links
 Minori Scramble! at Ufotable 
 

2007 manga
2012 anime OVAs
Comedy anime and manga
Seinen manga
Ufotable
Houbunsha manga
Comics about penguins